The Grand Prix Rouwmoer is a cyclo-cross race held in Essen, Belgium, which was until 2017 part of the BPost Bank Trophy.

Past winners

Women

Notes

References
 Results

Cycle races in Belgium
Cyclo-cross races
Recurring sporting events established in 1965
1965 establishments in Belgium
Essen, Belgium
Sport in Antwerp Province